Walter Patterson (died November 5, 1852) was an American politician from New York.

Life
Patterson was born in Columbia County, New York, where he completed preparatory studies. He was a member  of the New York State Assembly in 1818, and was Supervisor of the Town of Ancram in 1821 and 1823. At this time, he also managed the Ancram Iron Works.

He was elected as a Federalist to the 17th United States Congress, holding office from December 3, 1821, to March 3, 1823. Afterwards he removed to Livingston, New York and was Supervisor of the Town of Livingston from 1826 to 1828. He was an associate judge of the Columbia County Court from 1826 to 1830. He died in Philadelphia, Pennsylvania in 1852.

External links

The New York Civil List compiled by Franklin Benjamin Hough (pages 71, 193 and 296; Weed, Parsons and Co., 1858)
Ancram town officers at US Gen Net
Journal of the Academy of Natural Sciences of Philadelphia (1822, pages 289ff)
The New-York State Register for 1830 (page 155)

18th-century births
1852 deaths
Members of the New York State Assembly
19th-century American people
Year of birth unknown
People from Livingston, New York
Federalist Party members of the United States House of Representatives from New York (state)